The term Welsh Revival can refer to:

 The 1904–1905 Welsh Revival
 The Welsh Methodist revival
 The Celtic Revival of the Welsh language